Soheil Nasseri (born 1979) is an American pianist based in Berlin.

Concerts

Nasseri has premiered over two dozen works by contemporary composers since 2001. Notably, he performed the world premiere of Kaikhosru Shapurji Sorabji's Sonata No. 0 (1917) at Carnegie Hall in 2002, and made the first commercial recording thereof.

References

External links
 http://www.soheilnasseri.com/

Living people
American classical pianists
American male pianists
Iranian pianists
Iranian composers
Iranian classical musicians
American people of Iranian descent
1979 births
21st-century classical pianists
21st-century American male musicians
21st-century American pianists